Stenocarpus angustifolius is a species of flowering plant in the family Proteaceae and is endemic to Queensland. It is a shrub or small tree with narrow lance-shaped adult leaves, groups of creamy white flowers and cylindrical follicles.

Description
Juvenile leaves are deeply divided with narrow linear lobes.

Taxonomy
Stenocarpus angustifolius was first formally described in 1919 by Cyril Tenison White in the Botany Bulletin  of the Department of Agriculture, Queensland from specimens collected near Stannary Hills by Thomas Lane Bancroft. The specific epithet (angustifolius) means "narrow-leaved".

Distribution and habitat
This species grows in woodland and near watercourses in the ranges between Mingela and the Atherton Tableland in north Queensland.

References

Flora of Queensland
angustifolius
Plants described in 1919
Taxa named by Cyril Tenison White